The University of York Boat Club (UYBC) is the rowing club of the University of York. It was founded in 1963 by Richard Miles. The club's boathouse is located along the River Ouse in Fulford, York, North Yorkshire, United Kingdom. The club is composed of four squads: Senior Women, Senior Men, Novice Women and Novice Men. It also runs sessions for university staff and the community. The boat club is a GB World Class Start center, and as of 2016 was the university's largest sports club on campus, with over 200 members and a membership more than 50% female.

History 
The Boat Club was founded in October 1963 during the first month of activity of the newly established university. It was first hosted by York City Rowing Club which graciously allowed the students to use their equipment for no charge. In March 1965, the club entered its first competition: The Yorkshire Head of the River which took place in York. The Vice-Chancellor of the University, Lord James Rusholme suggested a boat race between the Lancaster University Boat Club and the University of York gave birth to the first Roses Boat Race was competed for 15 May 1965 and was won by York. This boat race has since evolved in the Roses tournament competed every year by the sports teams of both universities.

The club prides itself on its charity efforts being largely involved with events such as Movember raising over £2000 which was the most of any club on the University campus. The club has raised money for various causes by organising events such as a 24 hour sponsored row on the ergometer.  Events such as these make up a big part of the club culture of harnessing a community feel within the club by being fair, inclusive and dedicated in our endeavours on and off the water.

The club has appeared numerous times at Henley Royal Regatta, most recently in 2011, 2017 and 2021. The senior women's squad has been largely very successful at their respective Henley regatta qualifying for the main draw in June 2022 qualifying ninth and beating numerous international and domestic crews.

In 2016 the club became the first UK university boat club to introduce an LGBT policy, promoting it by adopting distinctive rainbow-coloured wellington boots.

Committee 
The club is entirely run by the students. The committee is elected each year in May. The committee comprises several club signatories and other less prominent roles such as Novice captains, Safety and Wellbeing officers, Social secretaries and a Development team.

Kit and Blades 
The club used "York" blue (a shade of sky blue) as its colour until the sports union unification in 2012. It now races in black and gold even though blue is still widely used throughout the club as it reflects the origins of the club and everything it has previously been unto this point. The club's blade design is black with a white rose of york. The blazer of the club remains blue with white edging and bears a modified version of the crest of the university’s arms (white rose of York with two crossed rowing oars behind it instead of the crossed keys of York). This is important for it retains the importance of the club's history which is epitomised throughout the sport of rowing.

Races 
The club partakes in various different races all around the academic year catering to those who are wanting to compete at various different levels. Throughout the winter the club partakes in Head Races such as York Autumn Sculls, Head of the Don, Fours Head, Rutherford and York Small Boats. After returning in the New Year the Club attends South Yorkshire Head, BUCS Head and both Women's Head of The River and Men's Head of The River.

The summer season consists of attending major events in the Rowing calendar such as Durham Regatta, the Metropolitan Regatta, Marlow Regatta and the respective Henley Royal and Women's Henley Regattas. 

The club also used to have a race against York Saint John University Rowing Club, and traditionally run the White Rose Head, a three-kilometre head-to-head race from on the River Ouse, from the university boathouse and the Lowther pub.

Jorvik B.C. 
Jorvik B.C. is the university's alumni's boat club. It was founded in 2011 and holds a number of events each year for former and current club members. It boasts members of some of the biggest rowing clubs in the country and races under the traditional colours of the club. This is a vibrant community of people who have passed through the club at various points in its history and continues to welcome new members on an annual basis.

 An annual Jorvik Dinner held in one of the grand boathouses in South West London along the river Thames.
 The Henley Royal Regatta Picnic which is usually held the Saturday of the race each July.
 The Jorvik vs UYBC boat race, a 400m race between the two clubs held each April in Henley on Thames.

The Jorvik Boat Club uses the old club colour: the York Blue.

References 

University and college rowing clubs in the United Kingdom
University of York
1963 establishments in England
Sports clubs established in 1963